Meatian is a locality in Victoria, Australia, located approximately 37 kilometers from Swan Hill, Victoria. Meatian is a small Victorian unbounded locality within the local government area of Gannawarra, it is located approximately 288 km from the capital Melbourne.

The Meatian Post Office opened around 1904 and closed in 1972.

References

Towns in Victoria (Australia)
Mallee (Victoria)
Rural City of Swan Hill